John Perkins Ralls, Sr. (January 1, 1822 – November 22, 1904) was a physician and representative from the state of Alabama to the Congress of the Confederate States during the American Civil War, not to be confused with John Rawls the 20th-century American philosopher.

Ralls was born in Greensboro, Georgia, on New Years Day, 1822. He attended medical school in Augusta, Georgia and Paris, France, and established a practice in Gadsden, Alabama. He married Agnes Mary Hamilton. They would eventually have eight children.

He represented Cherokee County, AL as a delegate to the Alabama secession convention in early 1861. He represented the state in the First Confederate Congress from 1862 to 1864. Following the war, he was a delegate to the Alabama state constitutional convention in 1875. He was elected to the Alabama State Legislature in 1878.

Ralls was actively involved in the Methodist Church and was a noted minister. One of his sons, Hamilton, was also a minister. He died in Gadsden, Alabama, on November 22, 1904, and was buried in Forrest Cemetery in Gadsden.

References

Members of the Confederate House of Representatives from Alabama
19th-century American politicians
Democratic Party members of the Alabama House of Representatives
People from Greensboro, Georgia
Politicians from Gadsden, Alabama
Physicians from Alabama
1812 births
1904 deaths
Alabama Secession Delegates of 1861